Carlos Alejandro Bracamontes Zenizo (born 4 January 1959) is a Mexican football manager and former player.

References

External links

1959 births
Living people
Footballers from Colima
Mexican footballers
People from Colima City
Association football midfielders
Toros Neza footballers
Atlético Morelia players
Club León footballers
Tecos F.C. footballers
Mexican football managers
Club León managers
Dorados de Sinaloa managers
Club Puebla managers